Cohors [prima] Batavorum milliaria civium Romanorum pia fidelis ("[1st] 1000 strong cohort of Roman citizens Batavi, dutiful and loyal") was a Roman auxiliary cohort of infantry.

Military diplomas 
The unit is attested on several military diplomas for the provinces of Pannonia, Pannonia Superior and Dacia Porolissensis.

Pannonia 
 98
 100/102 (RMD-03,144)

Pannonia Superior 
 112 (RMD-04,223)
 113 (RMD-02,86)

Dacia Porolissensis 
 133 (RMD-01,35)
 164

The unit is attested by two diplomas issued in 165 AD at castra of Gilău and Samum. In another diploma from Gilău, dated 161/162 AD, only the "milliaria" term is preserved.

Home base
The cohort was stationed in Dacia at Certinae. An inscription from Largiana could mention this unit too. After the unit left Dacia, it was probably stationed at Salonika in Macedonia.

Attested personnel 
The following personnel is attested on diplomas or inscriptions:

Commanders
 Αυρηλιος Ουαλεντινος (ca. 267)
 Galeo (Tettienus) Bellicus (ca. 164): he is listed on the military diploma
 Tullius Secundus (ca. 113): he is listed on the military diploma (RMD-02,86)

Soldiers
 Aelius Certus, signifer
 Aurelius Reatinus Birsi - miles from Potaissa
 C. Campanius Vitalis - centurion from Certiae 
 M. Ulpius, pedes: the diploma (RMD-02,86) was issued for him.
 Sextus, pedes: the diploma was issued for him.

See also 
 List of Roman auxiliary regiments

References
 Academia Română: Istoria Românilor, Vol. 2, Daco-romani, romanici, alogeni, 2nd. Ed., București, 2010, 
 Constantin C. Petolescu: Dacia - Un mileniu de istorie, Ed. Academiei Române, 2010, 
 John Spaul: Cohors² The evidence for and a short history of the auxiliary infantry units of the Imperial Roman Army, British Archaeological Reports 2000, BAR International Series (Book 841),

Citations 

Military of ancient Rome
Auxiliary equitata units of ancient Rome
Roman Dacia